Harrier Combat Simulator is a combat flight simulation game developed in 1986 by Mindscape for the Commodore 64. Ports for Amiga, Atari ST and IBM PC (as a self-booting disk) followed in 1988.

Plot

The player assumes the role of a pilot in a Harrier-jet. The player must master flying the jet, with its versatile horizontal and vertical thrust capabilities, and learn to control its advanced weaponry as well. The player character is the only jet fighter to survive an attack by saboteurs, and must destroy the enemy headquarters before the Sixth Fleet is destroyed. Most of the missions take place in Grenada; which was undergoing an American-led military invasion during the year 1984.

Reception
The game was reviewed in 1988 in Dragon #131 by Hartley, Patricia, and Kirk Lesser in "The Role of Computers" column. The reviewers gave the game 4 out of 5 stars. The 1992 Computer Gaming World survey of wargames with modern settings gave the game two stars out of five.

Computer Gaming World rated the game a 2 of 5.

Reviews
ASM (Aktueller Software Markt) - Jan, 1990

References

External links
Harrier Combat Simulator at GameSpot

1986 video games
Amiga games
Atari ST games
Combat flight simulators
Commodore 64 games
Mindscape games
Video games developed in the United Kingdom
Video games set in the 1980s